Moody House (or variations such as Moody Mansion or Homestead) may refer to:

Moody House (Bald Knob, Arkansas), listed on the National Register of Historic Places (NRHP)
Moody Mansion, Pittston, Maine
Moody Homestead, York, Maine, NRHP-listed
Rorick House Museum, also known as Malcolm A. Moody House, in The Dalles, Oregon, NRHP-listed
Willis-Moody Mansion, Galveston, Texas, NRHP-listed

See also
Moody Barn, Chisago City, Minnesota